The Independent Schools Association of Southern Africa (ISASA) is the largest and oldest association of independent schools in Southern Africa.

ISASA traces its origins back to the Conference of Headmasters and Headmistresses formed in 1929, and more recently to the Independent Schools Council, which was dissolved to create ISASA in 1999.

ISASA today is a not for profit company (NPC), which represents more than 730 independent schools in South Africa, Botswana, Eswatini, Namibia, Angola, Mozambique and Lesotho. Over 161,000 learners attend ISASA-affiliated schools.

Since the collapse of the apartheid state and the advent of democracy in South Africa, dramatic changes have occurred in the independent (private) school sector. In 1990, there were approximately 550 registered independent schools in the country. The dominant public perception of independent schools at that time was “white, affluent and exclusive”.

In 2014 there are at least 1584 independent schools in South Africa. The sector educates more than 500,000 learners, of which 73% are black (58% are Black African). Traditional, high-fee independent schools are now a minority in the sector, with only an estimated 15% of schools charging fees of more than R50 000 per annum.

Despite an increase in the number of for-profit independent schools, and in particular for-profit "chain schools", the sector remains largely not-for-profit. Most independent schools are also small schools, with 350 learners per school or less. This is partly because so many of them are newly established. The sector serves a wide range of different religions, philosophies and educational approaches across the full socio-economic spectrum.

Lebogang Montjane is the current Executive Director of ISASA. Other key personnel include John Lobban (Director: Membership and Operations) and  Sandile Ndaba (Director: Policy and Government Relations).

References

External links
Official website

Education in South Africa
Private and independent school organizations